Shizhong may refer to the following locations in the People's Republic of China:

Districts (市中区)
Shizhong District, Chongqing (former division)
Shizhong District, Guangyuan, Sichuan
Shizhong District, Leshan, Sichuan
Shizhong District, Neijiang, Sichuan
Shizhong District, Jinan, Shandong
Shizhong District, Jining, Shandong (former division)
Shizhong District, Zaozhuang, Shandong

Other
Shizhong, Longyan (适中镇), town in Xinluo District, Longyan, Fujian
Shizhong (侍中), an official position in ancient China. See Grand chancellor (China)#Tang dynasty.